Ricardo Diez (born 29 March 1975) is a retired Venezuelan athlete who specialised in the pole vault. He won several medals at regional level.

His personal best of 5.35 metres, set in 2000, is the standing national record.

He is now a coach in Singapore Sports School.

Competition record

References

1975 births
Living people
Venezuelan male pole vaulters
Athletes (track and field) at the 1999 Pan American Games
Athletes (track and field) at the 2003 Pan American Games
Pan American Games competitors for Venezuela
Central American and Caribbean Games silver medalists for Venezuela
Competitors at the 1998 Central American and Caribbean Games
Central American and Caribbean Games medalists in athletics
20th-century Venezuelan people
21st-century Venezuelan people